José Antonio Andrade was a Peninsular Spanish colonel who notably commanded royalist forces during the Mexican War of Independence. Amongst his more famous battles, he commanded troops in the Siege of Cuautla and the Capture of Orizaba, neither of which resulted in victory for the Spanish Crown.

See also 
 Mexican War of Independence
 Siege of Cuautla

References

Bibliography 
 

People of the Mexican War of Independence
Spanish army officers
Year of birth missing
Year of death missing